The 32nd Moscow International Film Festival was held from 17 to 26 June 2010. The Golden George was awarded to the Venezuelan drama film  Hermano directed by Marcel Rasquin.

Jury
 Luc Besson (France – President of the Jury)
 Catalina Saavedra (Chile)
 Veit Heiduschka (Germany)
 Mariya Mironova (Russia)
 Šarūnas Bartas (Lithuania)

Films in competition
The following films were selected for the main competition:

Awards
 Golden George: Hermano by Marcel Rasquin
 Special Jury Prize: Silver George: The Albanian by Johannes Naber
 Silver George:
 Best Director: Jan Kidawa-Błoński for Little Rose
 Best Actor: Nik Xhelilaj for The Albanian
 Best Actress: Vilma Cibulková for An Earthly Paradise For The Eyes
 Silver George for the best film of the Perspective competition: Rewers by Borys Lankosz
 Lifetime Achievement Award: Claude Lelouch
 Stanislavsky Award: Emmanuelle Béart

References

External links
Moscow International Film Festival: 2010 at Internet Movie Database

2010
2010 film festivals
2010 festivals in Europe
Mos
2010 in Moscow
June 2010 events in Russia